Tribal Research and Cultural Institute was established under Tribal Welfare Department in the year 1970 as per the decision of Government of India. It is dedicated to conduct research on tribal issues and also evaluate the various programmes'/schemes' impact on the tribes residing in Tripura.

Major activities 

 Research Studies
 Tribal Language Development
 Publication 
 Documentation works
 Seminar/ Workshop/Training
 Ethno-Cultural Museum
 Library
 Auditorium
 Tripura State Academy of Tribal Culture
 Associate Programme with Outside Institutes/Agencies
 Promotion of Tribal Culture

Wings 

 Research Wing
 Publication Wing
 Audio-Visual and Multi-Media Wing
 Tribal Language Wing
 Library
 Museum
 Auditorium
 Tripura State Academy of Tribal Culture

Tribes covered 

 Bhil
 Bhutia
 Chaimal
 Chakma
 Garo
 Halam
 Jamatia
 Khashia
 Kuki
 Lepcha
 Lushai
 Mog
 Munda
 Noatia
 Orang
 Reang
 Santal
 Tripuri
 Uchai

Functions 
The primary function of this institute is to conduct research on tribal issues as also to study and gauge the various schemes' impact on Tribal life in the state. It further offers in-serve training courses and also coaching to the tribal aspirants vying for jobs through degree and diploma courses among others. It also runs Youth Leadership Training Programmes aimed at tribal groups.

Facilitates 
Tripura State Tribal Museum is located in the building of this institute. The institute also has a library with books related to tribals. It publishes two research journals biannually, a literary journal 'SAIMA' and a journal on Tribal Life and culture 'TUI'.

Library 

 Impact of Block (Rubber) plantation in Tripura
 Cinema as Art & Popular Culture in Tripura: An Introduction
 Sri Rajmala Vol. I to IV

See also 

 Tripura State Tribal Museum

References

External links
 Official website

Research institutes in Agartala
Research institutes established in 1970
1970 establishments in Tripura
Research institutes in India